Show Pieces is a British short film series written by Alan Moore and directed by Mitch Jenkins. The series follows a man, Jimmy, who finds himself in a gentlemen's club after his death.

Five installments have been released, the last installment was financed via Kickstarter.
 
1. Act of Faith:
Faith Harrington, a young female reporter on a local newspaper who has an exotic private life, prepares for a stimulating evening at home that does not go according to plan.

2. Upon Reflection:
Details Faith Harrington's first bewildered arrival at the peculiar working men's club immediately after the event that concludes Act of Faith, all captured in a fixed security mirror above a club's oddly anachronistic lounge bar.

3. Jimmy's End:
Louche and hard-drinking womaniser James Mitchum finds himself wandering into one strange bar too many.

4. A Professional Relationship:
Explores the peculiar relationship between the club's two managers.

5. His Heavy Heart:
Picks up the narrative of the hapless James Mitchum from a point following his dreadful realization at the conclusion of Jimmy's End. In a grotesque parody of Egyptian funerary rites, James is shepherded less than gently into his unenviable afterlife.

In July 2014, Moore completed the screenplay for a feature film titled The Show, which will continue the story of Show Pieces.

The first, third, and fifth installments have been collected into a feature film, Show Pieces, which airs exclusively on Shudder.

References

External links
 

2014 films
British short films
2014 short films
2010s English-language films